Hanjin-Senator was achieved by combining the container fleets of Hanjin Shipping and Senator Lines, making Hanjin-Senator the eighth largest container shipping company in the world. Hanjin was Senator's majority shareholder; the two companies are run separately but combine their fleet numbers for statistical purposes.

The German subsidiary carrier Senator Lines announced on February 4, 2009 that they would be ceasing operations due to the economic downturn.

References

See also
 Hanjin Shipping
 Senator Lines

Container shipping companies
Hanjin Group